The 1949–50 Egyptian Premier League started in October 1948. Al-Ahly were crowned champions for the second time in total.

Clubs

Title Playoff

League table

Top goalscorers

Al-Ahly Results 

|}

External links 
 all about Egyptian football
 ALL ABOUT EGYTIAN PLAYERS
  best site about egyptianfootball
 RSSSF
 RSSSF competition history
   Egyptian Premier League schedule, match results, and match downloads

4
1949–50 in African association football leagues
1949–50 in Egyptian football